Kelli Young (born 7 April 1982) is an English pop singer. She was a member and lead singer of British pop group Liberty X from 2001 until they split in 2007 and again in 2012 when they reformed for a one-off reunion for an ITV2 series and performance at the Hammersmith Apollo.

Early and personal life
She went to Derby High School, Littleover, until she was 16, when she moved to London. She is married to songwriter Iain James and they have twin boys born in July 2012. Her mother is Bajan.

History

Career
While the five winning contestants of Popstars formed Hear'Say, the five runner-up contestants formed the group Liberty. The name Liberty was chosen to reflect the freedom the members experienced following their participation in Popstars. Amidst pejorative media commentary (including the term "Flopstars"), the act proceeded to sign a multi-million-pound record contract with Richard Branson's independent record label, V2 Records. Shortly after forming, Liberty received a legal challenge in the UK High Court from a funk R&B band, also called "Liberty", who achieved success in the 1990s, including being awarded Capital Radio Band of the Year, playing Wembley Arena, European tours and the release of albums in the UK, the US and Europe The original Liberty claimed that the newly formed Liberty was taking advantage of the goodwill that had been created by the former's success (known in English law as the "tort of passing off"). The final judgment was in favour of the funk R&B band and the ex-Popstars then asked readers of UK tabloid newspaper, The Sun to suggest a new name. The winning name was "X Liberty", but the group used the entry as the basis for the official title, "Liberty X".

Liberty X enjoyed seven Top 10 singles from 2001 to 2005. Their biggest hit, "Just a Little", reached Number 1 in May 2002. Its accompanying music video features Young wearing a black latex catsuit as part of a gang of professional burglars who steal a diamond from an atrium at the Vintners' Hall in London. "Thinking It Over", "Got to Have Your Love", "Song 4 Lovers", and "Holding on for You" all reached the top 5 in the UK Singles Chart. Their debut album, Thinking It Over, reached number 3 in June 2002. Liberty X released another two albums, Being Somebody and X, which reached number 12 and 27, respectively. Liberty X won two Brit Awards: for Best British Single and Best British Breakthrough Artist.

Young starred in the ITV show Britain Sings Christmas in 2007, performing a cover version of Mariah Carey's "All I Want for Christmas Is You". On 18 October, it was announced that Liberty X, along with other pop groups of their time such as B*Witched, Five and Atomic Kitten, would reunite for an ITV2 series called The Big Reunion, in which they would reveal about their individual stories about their life in the band before reforming for a gig singing their greatest hits.

Filmography

Discography

Featured singles

References

1982 births
Living people
21st-century Black British women singers
Liberty X
English people of Barbadian descent
English women pop singers
Musicians from Derby